Lunel-Viel (literally: "old Lunel") is a commune in the Hérault department in southern France. Lunel-Viel station has rail connections to Narbonne, Montpellier and Avignon.

Population

See also
Communes of the Hérault department

References

Communes of Hérault